Ram is the only album credited to the husband-and-wife music duo Paul and Linda McCartney, released on 17 May 1971 by Apple Records. It was recorded in New York with guitarists David Spinozza and Hugh McCracken, and future Wings drummer Denny Seiwell. Three singles were issued from the album: "Uncle Albert/Admiral Halsey" (McCartney's first number 1 hit in America without the Beatles), "The Back Seat of My Car" and "Eat at Home". The recording sessions also yielded the non-album single "Another Day".

The album's release coincided with a period of acrimony between McCartney and his former Beatle bandmates, and followed his legal action in the United Kingdom's High Court to dissolve the Beatles partnership. John Lennon perceived slights in the lyrics to songs such as "Too Many People". Although McCartney felt that he had addressed the criticisms he received with his 1970 solo debut, McCartney, Ram elicited a similarly unfavourable reaction from music journalists. It nonetheless topped the national album charts in the UK, the Netherlands and Canada. Today, Ram is held in high regard by many music critics and is often ranked as one of McCartney's best solo albums. It has also been recognised as an early indie pop album.

In 1971, McCartney produced Thrillington, an instrumental interpretation of Ram that was released in 1977 under the pseudonym Percy 'Thrills' Thrillington. In 2012, an expanded edition of Ram was reissued with over two dozen bonus tracks as part of the Paul McCartney Archive Collection. In 2020, Ram was ranked number 450 on Rolling Stones list of the greatest albums of all time.

Background
Paul McCartney and his family flew to New York City in October 1970 to begin working on the follow-up to McCartney. While the previous album had featured him playing every instrument, for Ram, McCartney decided to hold auditions for musicians, some of whom were brought in under the guise of recording a commercial jingle. Auditions were held in an attic on 45th Street for three days, where David Spinozza was recruited as guitarist by Linda, before auditions moved to a Bronx basement, where Denny Seiwell was brought in to play drums. McCartney once said he found Seiwell "lying on a mattress" in the basement. Midway through these sessions, Spinozza became unavailable and was replaced by Hugh McCracken.

Songs and production
The basic tracks for the album were taped at Columbia's Studio B from 12 October to 20 November 1970 before the McCartneys returned to their Scottish farm for the Christmas holidays. Work continued at Studio B and A&R Recording Studios, New York, from the second week of January 1971 through to February. Playing guitar or piano and singing at the same time, Paul chose to overdub his bass later on. Although it was a collaborative project, Linda's vocal duties were mostly limited to singing harmonies and backing Paul, who sang almost all of the lead parts. Linda sang co-lead on "Long Haired Lady". The McCartneys' daughter Heather, who had been adopted by Paul the previous year, sang backing vocals on "Monkberry Moon Delight".

"Ram On", from the album's first side, was reprised on the second side, before the album's final track, "The Back Seat of My Car". The New York Philharmonic was brought in by McCartney to play on "Uncle Albert/Admiral Halsey", "Long Haired Lady" and "The Back Seat of My Car", as well as the McCartneys' song "Another Day". "Uncle Albert/Admiral Halsey" is in a similar vein to the Abbey Road medley, as the song consisted of several unfinished songs combined into one. Music videos were made for "3 Legs" and "Heart of the Country", from footage that was filmed on 2 January 1971, and edited together five months later, by Ray Benson.

The project was moved to Sound Recording in Los Angeles, where much of the backing vocals were recorded. Producer Jim Guercio cancelled his honeymoon to oversee the project, but his direction was not followed by McCartney, and progress stalled. McCartney was unable to choose which of the 20+ recorded songs would be cut from the album. Guercio left the project to honour a previous booking, and Norwegian engineer Eirik Wangberg replaced him, finishing the album over the course of six weeks. McCartney gave Wangberg free rein to mix the songs as he saw fit, and sequence them for the album in any way he chose. Among the creative decisions made by Wangberg was the stitching together of two songs to make "Uncle Albert/Admiral Halsey", and the introduction of thunder sound effects to that song; the thunder was taken from a monaural film clip, recorded by Wangberg onto two tracks with small differences to make artificial stereo. Paul and Linda were very happy upon hearing the final album mix.

The recording project also yielded the independent single "Another Day" and its B-side, "Oh Woman, Oh Why", released in mid-February 1971. Session songs dropped from the album sequence included "Little Woman Love" and tracks later featured on Wings' 1973 album Red Rose Speedway: "Get on the Right Thing", "Little Lamb Dragonfly" and "Big Barn Bed". "I Lie Around", issued as the B-side to Wings' 1973 single "Live and Let Die", was taped during these sessions. Also recorded was the first incarnation of "Seaside Woman". McCartney also recorded "Hey Diddle", "A Love for You", "Great Cock and Seagull Race", "Now Hear This Song of Mine", "Rode All Night", "Sunshine Sometimes" and "When the Wind Is Blowing".

References to the Beatles and others
According to Peter Brown, the Beatles' former business associate, John Lennon believed that several of the songs on Ram contained personal jibes directed at himself and Yoko Ono, among them "Dear Boy" and, particularly, "Too Many People". McCartney later conceded that some of the lyrics of "Too Many People" had been "a little dig at John and Yoko", with "preaching practices" and "you took your lucky break and broke it in two" being direct references to Lennon. Brown also described the picture of two beetles copulating on the back cover as symbolic of how McCartney felt the other Beatles were treating him. George Harrison and Ringo Starr were said to interpret the track "3 Legs" as an attack on them and Lennon. According to McCartney, "Dear Boy" was directed at Linda's ex-husband, and not Lennon.

Release
"Another Day" / "Oh Woman, Oh Why" was released that February and became a worldwide Top 5 hit. In May, Ram was unveiled, on 17th in the US and on the 21st in the UK. "The Back Seat of My Car" was excerpted as a UK single that August, only reaching number 39, but the US release of the ambitious "Uncle Albert/Admiral Halsey" proved much more successful, giving McCartney his first number 1 single since leaving the Beatles. The album reached number 1 in the UK and number 2 in the US, where it spent over five months in the Top 10 and went platinum. Despite the phasing-out of monaural albums by the late 1960s, Ram was pressed in mono with unique mixes that differ from the common stereo version. These were only made available to radio stations and are among the most valuable and sought-after of Paul McCartney's solo records. The album has sold over 2 million copies.

In July, Northern Songs and Maclen Music sued Paul and Linda McCartney for violating an exclusive rights agreement by collaborating on "Another Day". Although six of the eleven songs on Ram were also co-written with Linda, both parties agreed the issue of royalties for the album could be decided at a later date. In June 1972, Associated Television (ATV), which then owned Northern Songs, announced that "all differences between them have been amicably settled" and the McCartneys signed a new seven-year co-publishing contract between ATV and McCartney Music.

Critical reception
Upon its release, Ram was poorly received by music critics. McCartney was particularly hurt by the harsh reviews − especially as he had attempted to address the points raised in criticism of his earlier album, McCartney, by adopting a more professional approach this time around. In his review for Rolling Stone, Jon Landau called Ram "incredibly inconsequential" and "monumentally irrelevant", and criticised its lack of intensity and energy. He added that it exposes McCartney as having "benefited immensely from collaboration" with the Beatles, particularly John Lennon, who "held the reins in on McCartney's cutsie-pie, florid attempts at pure rock muzak" and kept him from "going off the deep end that leads to an album as emotionally vacuous as Ram". Playboy accused McCartney of "substituting facility for any real substance", and compared it to "watching someone juggle five guitars: It's fairly impressive, but you keep wondering why he bothers." In NME, Alan Smith further called it "an excursion into almost unrelieved tedium" and "the worst thing Paul McCartney has ever done." Robert Christgau, writing in The Village Voice, called it "a bad record, a classic form/content mismatch", and felt that McCartney succumbed to "conspicuous consumption" by overworking himself and obscenely producing a style of music meant to be soft and whimsical. In a slightly more positive note, Chris Charlesworth of Melody Maker found Ram an overall better record than McCartney, but still found it subpar to the recent releases of Harrison and Lennon. Charlesworth concluded: "A good album by anybody's standards and certainly far better than the majority released by British groups and singers. Trouble is you expect too much from a man like Paul McCartney." Writing four years later, Roy Carr and Tony Tyler from NME suggested that "it would be naive to have expected the McCartneys to produce anything other than a mediocre record ... Grisly though this was, McCartney was to sink lower before rescuing his credibility late in 1973."

His fellow ex-Beatles, all of whom were riding high in critical favour with their recent releases, were likewise vocal in their negativity. Lennon hated the album, dismissing his former songwriting partner's efforts as "muzak to my ears" in his song "How Do You Sleep?" Starr told the UK's Melody Maker: "I feel sad about Paul's albums ... I don't think there's one [good] tune on the last one, Ram ... he seems to be going strange." In addition to conducting a war of words in the British music press, "Crippled Inside", another track on Lennon's Imagine album, was also thought to be directed at McCartney. Early editions of Imagine included a postcard of Lennon pulling the ears of a pig in a parody of Rams cover photograph of McCartney holding a ram by the horns.

Retrospect

The 2012 reissue of Ram received an aggregate score of 86 out of 100 from Metacritic, based on twelve reviews – a score that the website defines as indicating "universal acclaim". Reviewing this issue, Mojo said that "today it sounds quintessentially McCartney". AllMusic editor Stephen Thomas Erlewine wrote: "in retrospect it looks like nothing so much as the first indie pop album, a record that celebrates small pleasures with big melodies". Pitchforks Jayson Greene similarly felt McCartney was "inventing an approach to pop music that would eventually become someone else's indie pop," and called Ram "a domestic-bliss album, one of the weirdest, earthiest, and most honest ever made". Simon Vozick-Levinson of Rolling Stone dubbed it a "daffy masterpiece" and "a grand psychedelic ramble full of divine melodies and orchestral frippery".

David Quantick of Uncut felt that, although it is not as "legendary" as publicised, the album is "occasionally brilliant and historically fascinating" as "post-Beatles mish-mash". Steven Hyden, writing for The A.V. Club, said that the "lightweight" style that was originally panned by critics is "actually (when heard with sympathetic ears) a big part of what makes it so appealing". However, Q magazine still found Ram to be "frustratingly uneven". In a retrospective review in 1981, Robert Christgau panned McCartney's songs as pretentious "crotchets ... so lightweight they float away even as Paulie layers them down with caprices".

Reissues
In 1977, McCartney supervised the release of an instrumental interpretation of Ram (recorded in June 1971 and arranged by Richard Hewson) with the release of Thrillington under the pseudonym of Percy "Thrills" Thrillington. Thrillington was later released as part of the 2012 super-deluxe release of Ram.

Ram, along with McCartney's Wings over America and Tug of War albums, was issued in the US on compact disc on 18 January 1988. In 1993, the album was remastered and reissued on CD as part of The Paul McCartney Collection series with "Another Day" and "Oh Woman, Oh Why" as bonus tracks. That same year Digital Compact Classics released an audiophile edition prepared by Steve Hoffman.
 
On 21 May 2012 (in the UK) and 22 May (in the US), the album was reissued by McCartney's current label, Hear Music as part of the Paul McCartney Archive Collection. This reissue included the mono mix, which had never been issued previously on compact disc, except by bootleggers. The mono version was also released commercially in 2012, albeit as a limited edition LP. The 2012 reissue was accompanied by the Record Store Day exclusive edition of "Another Day" single.

Tributes
In 2009, two tribute albums featuring all of the songs from the album were put together:
 Ram On L.A was compiled by the website Aquarium Drunkard and released as a digital download, featuring Los Angeles-based acts.
 Tom: A Best Show on WFMU Tribute to Ram was put together by WFMU DJ Tom Scharpling for the New Jersey radio station's annual fundraising marathon as a CD made available exclusively to those who donated to his show. Artists included Aimee Mann, Death Cab for Cutie and Ted Leo, among others.

In 2012, Danish rock singer/songwriter Tim Christensen, American singer/songwriters Mike Viola and Tracy Bonham, and Christensen's solo band the Damn Crystals did a one-off tribute show, performing Ram in full length along with other post-Beatles songs, at Vega in Copenhagen, in celebration of McCartney's 70th birthday. In 2013 this tribute concert was released as the DVD/CD and DVD/2-LP album Pure McCartney.

In 2021, Denny Seiwell teamed up with Fernando Perdomo to produce Ram On: The 50th Anniversary Tribute to Paul and Linda McCartney's Ram. The album has over 100 musicians from all over the world creating a new version of Ram and the single tracks "Another Day" and "Oh Woman, Oh Why". The contributors included Seiwell, Spinozza and Marvin Stamm from the original sessions, along with Davey Johnstone, Will Lee, Joey Santiago of the Pixies, Eric Dover formerly of Jellyfish, and Carnie Wilson. Cherry Red Records released the album on May 17, 2021.

Track listing

Side one

 "Too Many People"  – 4:10
 "3 Legs"  – 2:44
 "Ram On"  – 2:26
 "Dear Boy"  – 2:12
 "Uncle Albert/Admiral Halsey"  – 4:49
 "Smile Away"  – 3:51

Side two

 "Heart of the Country"  – 2:21
 "Monkberry Moon Delight"  – 5:21
 "Eat at Home"  – 3:18
 "Long Haired Lady"  – 5:54
 "Ram On (Reprise)"  – 0:52
 "The Back Seat of My Car"  – 4:26

Archive Collection Reissue

Ram was reissued in several packages:
Standard Edition 1-CD; the original 12-track album
Standard Edition digital download; the original 12-track album
Special Edition 2-CD; the original 12-track album on the first disc, plus 8 bonus tracks on a second disc
Deluxe Edition Box Set 4-CD/1-DVD; the original 12-track album, the bonus tracks disc, the original album in mono, Thrillington, DVD of films (including the documentary 'Ramming' narrated by Paul and directed by Ben Ib, as well as the original music videos for "Heart of the Country" and "3 Legs"), 112-page book, 5 prints, 8 facsimiles of lyric sheets, photograph book, and download link to all of the material
Remastered vinyl 2-LP version of the Special Edition and a download link to the material
Remastered mono vinyl limited edition LP of the mono mixes
Remastered (Record Store Day 2012 exclusive) vinyl single of "Another Day" and "Oh Woman, Oh Why"
 50th Anniversary Half-Speed Remaster Vinyl 2021

Disc 1 – The original album
The original 12-track album.

Disc 2 – Bonus tracks

All songs written by Paul McCartney, except "Another Day", "Little Woman Love", and "Hey Diddle", written with Linda McCartney.

"Another Day"  – 3:42
"Oh Woman, Oh Why"  – 4:35
"Little Woman Love" " – 2:08
"A Love for You"  – 4:08
"Hey Diddle"  – 3:49
"Great Cock and Seagull Race"  – 2:35
"Rode All Night" – 8:44
"Sunshine Sometime"  – 3:20
Tracks 4–8 are previously unreleased

Disc 3 – Ram mono
The mono version of the original 12-song album.
Disc 4 – Thrillington
The Thrillington album.

Writing credits correspond to that of the original album.

"Too Many People" – 4:31
"3 Legs" – 3:41
"Ram On" – 2:49
"Dear Boy" – 2:50
"Uncle Albert/Admiral Halsey" – 4:56
"Smile Away" – 4:39
"Heart of the Country" – 2:27
"Monkberry Moon Delight" – 4:36
"Eat at Home" – 3:28
"Long Haired Lady" – 5:44
"The Back Seat of My Car" – 4:51

Disc 5 – DVD
Ramming – 11:15
Making of the album
"Heart of the Country" – 2:41
Promo video
"3 Legs" – 3:03
Promo video
"Hey Diddle" – 2:48
Previously unreleased
"Eat at Home" on Tour – 4:31

Digital-only bonus tracks
Available only on Paulmccartney.com and iTunes.
"Eat at Home" / "Smile Away"  – 8:24
 Performed by Wings
"Uncle Albert Jam" – 2:17

Personnel
Paul McCartney – lead and harmony vocals, acoustic and electric guitars, ukulele on "Ram On", bass, piano, keyboards
Linda McCartney – harmony and backing vocals; co-lead vocals on "Long Haired Lady"
David Spinozza – guitar on "3 Legs", "Eat at Home", "The Back Seat of My Car" and "Another Day"
Hugh McCracken – guitar
Denny Seiwell – drums
Heather McCartney – backing vocals on "Monkberry Moon Delight"
Marvin Stamm – flugelhorn on "Uncle Albert/Admiral Halsey"
New York Philharmonic on "Uncle Albert/Admiral Halsey" and "The Back Seat of My Car"

Charts

Weekly charts

Year-end charts

Certifications

References
Footnotes

Citations

Sources

 
 
 
 
 
 
 
 
 
 
 
 
 
 
 
 

 Further reading

External links 
 

1971 albums
Apple Records albums
Paul McCartney albums
Linda McCartney albums
Albums produced by Paul McCartney
Albums produced by Linda McCartney
Columbia Records albums